Buna is an unincorporated community and census-designated place (CDP) in Jasper County, Texas, United States. The population was 2,137 at the 2020 census.

History
The Beaumont Lumber Company mill in southern Jasper County was first called "Carrolla" for the Carroll family, prominent Beaumont lumbermen and industrialists. The site was subsequently renamed "Buna", however, in honor of one of the family's cousins, Buna Corley.

Geography
Buna is located in southern Jasper County at  (30.439390, -93.966199). Texas State Highway 62 leads southeast  to Mauriceville.

The community sits on a low watershed divide, with the west side of town draining to the Neches River and the east side draining to the Sabine River.

Demographics

As of the 2020 United States census, there were 2,137 people, 802 households, and 557 families residing in the CDP.

As of the census of 2000, there were 2,269 people, 865 households, and 626 families residing in the CDP. The population density was 381.4 people per square mile (147.2/km2). There were 956 housing units at an average density of 160.7/sq mi (62.0/km2). The racial makeup of the CDP was 86.16% White, 11.37% African American, 0.44% Native American, 0.13% Asian, 0.09% Pacific Islander, 0.71% from other races, and 1.10% from two or more races. Hispanic or Latino of any race were 1.50% of the population.

There were 865 households, out of which 35.3% had children under the age of 18 living with them, 58.4% were married couples living together, 11.6% had a female householder with no husband present, and 27.6% were non-families. 25.7% of all households were made up of individuals, and 11.1% had someone living alone who was 65 years of age or older. The average household size was 2.57 and the average family size was 3.07.

In the CDP, the population was spread out, with 26.3% under the age of 18, 10.0% from 18 to 24, 26.8% from 25 to 44, 23.0% from 45 to 64, and 13.9% who were 65 years of age or older. The median age was 36 years. For every 100 females, there were 87.7 males. For every 100 females age 18 and over, there were 86.1 males.

The median income for a household in the CDP was $29,611, and the median income for a family was $33,952. Males had a median income of $29,766 versus $20,848 for females. The per capita income for the CDP was $13,999. About 10.2% of families and 11.9% of the population were below the poverty line, including 12.1% of those under age 18 and 11.2% of those age 65 or over.

Notable residents
 Mark Nesler, country music singer-songwriter who grew up in Buna
 Micah Tyler, singer, songwriter

Education
Buna is served by the Buna Independent School District and is home to the Buna High School Cougars.

References

Census-designated places in Jasper County, Texas
Census-designated places in Texas
Unincorporated communities in Jasper County, Texas
Unincorporated communities in Texas